Gureikha is a rural locality (a village) in Staroselskoye Rural Settlement, Vologodsky District, Vologda Oblast, Russia. The population was 11 as of 2002.

Geography 
Gureikha is located 54 km west of Vologda (the district's administrative centre) by road. Kipelovo is the nearest rural locality.

References 

Rural localities in Vologodsky District